Tirschenreuth (Northern Bavarian: Landgreis Tirschenreith) is a Landkreis (district) in the northeastern part of Bavaria, Germany. Neighboring districts are (from the south, clockwise) Neustadt an der Waldnaab, Bayreuth and Wunsiedel. To the east are the Czech districts of Tachov (Plzeň) and Cheb (Karlovy Vary).

Geography
The district is located in the hills of the Fichtelgebirge. Main rivers in the district are the Waldnaab and the Fichtelnaab.

History
The district was formed in 1972 by merging the previous districts Tirschenreuth and Kemnath.

Coat of arms
The golden lion in the left of the coat of arms is the symbol of the Electorate of the Palatinate. The red dragon in the right is the symbol of the Waldsassen Abbey, and symbolizes the margravate of Diepolding. Only the upper part of the dragon is shown (while the monastery had the full dragon as their symbol), to symbolize that the status of the monastery was reduced in 1803 from an imperial monastery to a subordinate of the Palatinate. The blue bar in the bottom right is the symbol of the landgraves of Leuchtenberg, parts of the historically owned by them was included into the district in 1972.

Towns and municipalities

References

External links

 Official website (German)

 
Districts of Bavaria